= Erich Reinhardt =

German business executive

Erich Reinhardt is the former CEO of the Healthcare Sector of Siemens. He obtained PhD in Electrical engineering at University of Stuttgart, Germany.

The resignation of Professor Reinhardt from the Healthcare division of Siemens AG was announced on 23 April 2008. He is a Harvard Business School case study.

His resignation became effective on 30 April 2008. He was succeeded by Jim Reid-Anderson who became the CEO of Siemens Healthcare Diagnostics, but JRA stepped down after only 7 months in office to be replaced by Hermann Requardt, former COO of Siemens Healthcare and CTO and Board Member of Siemens AG.

In 1995 Siemens' medical business was losing customers and wasn't making money. Erich Reinhardt was placed in-charge. He shifted the focus to speeding work flow for the medical technicians using his machines. He doubled the revenues in 7 years and reduced the focus from equipment to healthcare IT, overseeing the acquisition of Shared Medical Systems, and later three diagnostics companies that made Siemens #1 in diagnostics in the world.
